= Khandabad =

- village
- Location within Madhya Pradesh Location within India
- Coordinates: 23.100876°N 77.480510°E
- Country: India
- State: Madhya Pradesh
- District: Bhopal
- Tehsil: Huzur

Population (2011)
  - Total: 137
- Time zone: UTC+5:30 (IST)
- ISO 3166 code: MP-IN
- Census code: 482540

Khandabad is a village in the Bhopal district of Madhya Pradesh, India. It is located in the Huzur tehsil and the Phanda block. The Tapti Vihar Phase II township is being developed here.

== Demographics ==
According to the 2011 census of India, Khandabad has 32 households. The effective literacy rate (i.e. the literacy rate of population excluding children aged 6 and below) is 82.93%.

Demographics (2011 Census)
	Total	Male	Female
Population	137	71	66
Children aged below 6 years	14	8	6
Scheduled caste	29	17	12
Scheduled tribe	0	0	0
Literates	102	57	45
Workers (all)	78	40	38
Main workers (total)	42	38	4
Main workers: Cultivators	15	15	0
Main workers: Agricultural labourers	6	5	1
Main workers: Household industry workers	0	0	0
Main workers: Other	21	18	3
Marginal workers (total)	36	2	34
Marginal workers: Cultivators	0	0	0
Marginal workers: Agricultural labourers	36	2	34
Marginal workers: Household industry workers	0	0	0
Marginal workers: Others	0	0	0
Non-workers	59	31	28
